Stephen Douglas Jacobs (born 5 July 1961) is an English former professional footballer who made 156 appearances in the Football League playing as a full back or midfielder for Coventry City, Brighton & Hove Albion and Gillingham. He was also on the books of Charlton Athletic without playing for them in the league.

References

1961 births
Living people
Footballers from West Ham
English footballers
Association football defenders
Coventry City F.C. players
Brighton & Hove Albion F.C. players
Charlton Athletic F.C. players
Gillingham F.C. players
English Football League players